Pappy's Puppy is a 1955 Warner Bros. Merrie Melodies cartoon short directed by Friz Freleng. The short was released on December 17, 1955, and stars Sylvester the Cat. Mel Blanc provides all of the vocal characterizations; however, aside from whistling, Sylvester does not speak in this short.

Plot
At a hospital, Butch the bulldog paces nervously, waiting for his baby to be born. When it did as a boy, Butch happily faints. Back at home, Butch teaches his new son how to walk, act tough, and bite cats. One day, the young bulldog is playing with a ball when he comes upon Sylvester. His training kicks in and he attacks Sylvester, who proceeds to place the small bulldog under a tin can. However, Butch catches Sylvester doing this and exacts revenge by taking Sylvester to a shed and hammering the tin can on his head. 

Later, Sylvester is walking along while the baby bulldog is biting at his tail. He slaps the bulldog off camera, only for Butch to catch up with him and hit Sylvester. After that, Sylvester reluctantly plays 'fetch' with the baby bulldog, but decides to throw the stick into a busy street, hoping the bulldog will be flattened. However, the young bulldog retrieves it successfully. Annoyed, Sylvester prepares to throw it again but Butch sees this and throws the stick into traffic himself, pointing for Sylvester to fetch the stick this time. Sylvester successfully retrieves it amidst heavy traffic, but is run over by a man on a scooter on the sidewalk. 

Once again, Sylvester plays fetch with the young bulldog and throws a ball into a doghouse, which Sylvester boards up when the bulldog chases the ball into it. Sylvester plans to drop an already lit stick of dynamite into the open hole on the top. However, Butch once again catches Sylvester and places the doghouse over Sylvester instead, nailing the hole shut with a board. Sylvester does not hammer out the nails in the board in time, as the dynamite explodes. In the final set piece of the cartoon, Sylvester sets up a booby trap of a dog bone hooked up to a shotgun. When Butch's son begins tugging on the bone, Butch gives Sylvester a stern look, prompting Sylvester to run over and plug the shotgun hole with his finger so the young bulldog is unharmed, getting his finger shot over and over (including once in the face) as Butch's son tugs. The stork arrives and announces Butch has even more puppies to add to his family. The cartoon ends as Sylvester, finally having enough of dealing with the bulldog puppies and Butch's abuses, chases the stork and shoots at him.

Stock Footage
In a rarely seen CBS Saturday morning showing of Satan's Waitin, stock footage is used for an alternative ending. When Sylvester declares he does not want Tweety, it next shows him walking along the sidewalk. Butch's son attacks his tail and is put under the tin can. The plot plays out with Butch arriving, grabbing Sylvester and freeing his son. Instead of Butch hammering the can on Sylvester, it shows Sylvester walking, with the puppy biting and pulling his tail. Butch watches from his doghouse. The cartoon irises out, with Sylvester's purgatory, becoming the puppy's "playmate".

See also
List of American films of 1955

References

External links
 

1955 films
1955 comedy films
Merrie Melodies short films
1950s Warner Bros. animated short films
1955 animated films
1955 short films
Animated films about cats
Animated films about dogs
1950s English-language films
Sylvester the Cat films
Short films directed by Friz Freleng
Films scored by Carl Stalling